In mathematics, a symmetric bilinear form on a vector space is a bilinear map from two copies of the vector space to the field of scalars such that the order of the two vectors does not affect the value of the map. They are also referred to more briefly as just symmetric forms when "bilinear" is understood.

Symmetric bilinear forms on finite-dimensional vector spaces precisely correspond to symmetric matrices given a basis for V. Among bilinear forms, the symmetric ones are important because they are the ones for which the vector space admits a particularly simple kind of basis known as an orthogonal basis (at least when the characteristic of the field is not 2).

Given a symmetric bilinear form B, the function  is the associated quadratic form on the vector space. Moreover, if the characteristic of the field is not 2, B is the unique symmetric bilinear form associated with q.

Formal definition 
Let  V be a vector space of dimension n over a field K.  A map  is a symmetric bilinear form on the space if:
 
 
 

The last two axioms only establish linearity in the first argument, but the first axiom (symmetry) then immediately implies linearity in the second argument as well.

Examples 

Let , the n dimensional real vector space. Then the standard dot product is a symmetric bilinear form, . The matrix corresponding to this bilinear form (see below) on a standard basis is the identity matrix.

Let V be any vector space (including possibly infinite-dimensional), and assume T is a linear function from V to the field.

Let V be the vector space of continuous single-variable real functions. For  one can define . By the properties of definite integrals, this defines a symmetric bilinear form on V. This is an example of a symmetric bilinear form which is not associated to any symmetric matrix (since the vector space is infinite-dimensional).

Matrix representation
The matrix A is a symmetric matrix exactly due to symmetry of the bilinear form. If we let the n×1 matrix x represent the vector v with respect to this basis, and similarly let the n×1 matrix y represent the vector w, then  is given by :

Suppose  C'  is another basis for V, with :

with S an invertible n×n matrix.
Now the new matrix representation for the symmetric bilinear form is given by

Orthogonality and singularity

The radical of a bilinear form B is the set of vectors orthogonal with every vector in V.  That this is a subspace of V follows from the linearity of B in each of its arguments.  When working with a matrix representation A with respect to a certain basis, v, represented by x, is in the radical if and only if

The matrix A is singular if and only if the radical is nontrivial.

Orthogonal basis
A basis  is orthogonal with respect to B if and only if :

When the characteristic of the field is not two, V always has an orthogonal basis.  This can be proven by induction.

A basis C is orthogonal if and only if the matrix representation A is a diagonal matrix.

Signature and Sylvester's law of inertia
In a more general form, Sylvester's law of inertia says that, when working over an ordered field, the numbers of diagonal elements in the diagonalized form of a matrix that are positive, negative and zero respectively are independent of the chosen orthogonal basis.  These three numbers form the signature of the bilinear form.

Real case
When working in a space over the reals, one can go a bit a further.  Let  be an orthogonal basis.

We define a new basis 

Now, the new matrix representation A will be a diagonal matrix with only 0, 1 and −1 on the diagonal.  Zeroes will appear if and only if the radical is nontrivial.

Complex case
When working in a space over the complex numbers, one can go further as well and it is even easier.
Let  be an orthogonal basis.

We define a new basis  :

Now the new matrix representation A will be a diagonal matrix with only 0 and 1 on the diagonal.  Zeroes will appear if and only if the radical is nontrivial.

Orthogonal polarities
Let B be a symmetric bilinear form with a trivial radical on the space V over the field K with characteristic not 2.  One can now define a map from D(V), the set of all subspaces of V, to itself:

This map is an orthogonal polarity on the projective space PG(W).  Conversely, one can prove all orthogonal polarities are induced in this way, and that two symmetric bilinear forms with trivial radical induce the same polarity if and only if they are equal up to scalar multiplication.

References
 
 
 

Bilinear forms